Route 358 is a collector road in the Canadian province of Nova Scotia.

It is located in Kings County and connects Greenwich at Trunk 1 with Scot's Bay. Between Port Williams and Canard, the highway crosses the Canard River and the low fields of the riverbank in a wide curve, tracing the path of the Grand Dyke, built by the Acadians about 1750.

Communities

 Greenwich
 Port Williams
 Canard
 Hillaton
 Canning
 The Lookoff
 Scot's Bay

Parks
Scots Bay Provincial Park
Blomidon Provincial Park
Cape Split Provincial Park Reserve

History

The section of the Collector Highway 358 from Canard to Canning was designated as part of the Trunk Highway 41.

See also
List of Nova Scotia provincial highways

References

Nova Scotia provincial highways
Roads in Kings County, Nova Scotia